The Canadian cricket team visited Ireland on 12 August 2008. The teams were scheduled to play one One-day International before the end of the tour on 12 August 2008 – the planned game was abandoned due to inclement weather without a ball being bowled.

Event

Only ODI

2008 in Irish cricket
2008 in Canadian cricket
International cricket competitions in 2008
Canadian cricket tours of Ireland